The Roger New York is a luxury hotel in midtown Manhattan, New York City. The hotel is operated and managed by Los Angeles-based JRK Property Holdings. 

Originally built atop a plot of land leased from the 150-year-old Madison Avenue Baptist Church next door, the hotel was named "Roger Williams" in honor of the Rhode Island theologian and abolitionist who started the first Baptist Church in America.

See also
 List of New York City hotels

References

External links
The Roger New York official website

Hotels in Manhattan
Midtown Manhattan
Hotels established in 1930
Hotel buildings completed in 1930

